Ranui Swanson Football Club is an amateur football club in West Auckland, New Zealand. They currently compete in the NRF Championship which is step 5 on the New Zealand football pyramid.

Ranui Swanson was formed in 1979, starting with 4 teams. The club has also competed in the Chatham Cup, New Zealand's premier knockout tournaments for men. Their first season in the competition was in 1983 when they lost in the first round to Pt Chevalier 4–1.

References

External links
 Club website

Association football clubs in Auckland
1979 establishments in New Zealand
Sport in West Auckland, New Zealand